Francine Boulay-Parizeau (born July 13, 1953 in Lachine, Quebec) is a Canadian former handball player who competed in the 1976 Summer Olympics.

She was part of the Canadian handball team, which finished sixth in the Olympic tournament. She played four matches and scored one goal.

References
 profile

1953 births
Living people
Canadian female handball players
Olympic handball players of Canada
Handball players at the 1976 Summer Olympics
Sportspeople from Montreal
People from Lachine, Quebec
French Quebecers